Windross is a surname. Notable people with the surname include:

Dennis Windross (1938–1989), British footballer 
Rose Windross, British singer-songwriter

See also
Windrose (disambiguation)

English-language surnames